The Superior Court of Cook County was a court in Cook County, Illinois.

It was preceded by earlier courts. 1845 saw the creation of the County Court of Cook County. In 1849, this was renamed The Cook County Court of Common Pleas. In 1859, this was continued as the newly-founded The Superior Court of Chicago. In 1870, this was formally continued as the Superior Court of Cook County, which was created by the newly-adopted Constitution of Illinois.

The Superior Court of Cook County, and its predecessor courts, held roughly the same jurisdiction as the original Circuit Court of Cook County.

The court ceased to exist in 1964 after an amendment to the Constitution of Illinois took effect, creating of the modern Circuit Court of Cook County, unifying Cook County's court system.

Notable judges
Notable individuals who served as judges of the court include:
John Peter Altgeld (served 1886–1891)
Richard B. Austin (served 1953–1960)
William Emmett Dever (served 1910–1916)
Frederic R. DeYoung (served in 1921)
Joseph Gary
Jesse Holdom
Edgar A. Jonas (served 1940–1941)
Roger Kiley (served in 1940)
Benjamin Drake Magruder (served 1868–1885)
William H. McSurely
Abraham Lincoln Marovitz (served 1950–1963)
Alexander Napoli (served 1960–1963)
James Benton Parsons (served 1960–1961)
John Barton Payne (served 1893–1898)
Edwin Albert Robson (served 1945–1951; served as chief justice 1949–1951)
Walter Steffen (served 1922–1937)
Rollin S. Williamson (served 1880–1886)

Other notable individuals
Hugo Friend (served as a master in chancery 1916–1920)
Martin Gorski (served as a master in chancery 1929–1942)
William W. Link (served as chief clerk 1942–1943)
James Robert Mann (served as a master in chancery)
Philip Leo Sullivan (served as a master in chancery 1916–1917)
Hempstead Washburne (served as a mastery in chancery)

See also
Pullman Palace Car Co. v. Speck

References

 
1870 establishments in Illinois
1964 disestablishments in Illinois
Courts and tribunals established in 1870
Courts and tribunals disestablished in 1964